The Lesum is a  river in northern Germany, right tributary of the Weser, navigable for Class III ships. It is formed at the confluence of the rivers Wümme and Hamme, near Ritterhude, northwest of Bremen. It flows west and flows into the Weser in Bremen-Vegesack.

See also
List of rivers of Bremen
List of rivers of Lower Saxony

References

 
Rivers of Bremen (state)
Rivers of Lower Saxony
Federal waterways in Germany
Rivers of Germany